is a railway station in Sangō, Nara Prefecture, Japan.

Lines
West Japan Railway Company
Yamatoji Line

History 
Sangō station opened on 3 March 1980.

Station numbering was introduced in March 2018 with Sangō being assigned station number JR-Q30.

References 

Railway stations in Japan opened in 1980
Railway stations in Nara Prefecture